Kyle Herranen (born July 5, 1977) is a Canadian visual artist. He studied Traditional Animation at Sheridan College in Oakville, Ontario (1997) before earning a Bachelor of Fine Arts at York University in Toronto (2004) and receiving his Master of Fine Arts from the University of Regina in Regina, Saskatchewan (2008). Herranen lives and works in Regina, Saskatchewan, Canada.

Work 

The artist is an interdisciplinary artist that produces a range of work including: installation art, painting, photography, performance, and sculpture. His work is invested in notions and concepts of material. Using materials as signifiers, he subtly interrogates hierarchical and dichotomous categories, including urban and rural, public and private, real and representational, masculine and feminine, modern and contemporary. Kyle was included in Mind the Gap!, a National touring exhibition. In the fall of 2012 Galleries West named Kyle one of Canada's "Who's Who of Collectable Artists". Herranen has exhibited both provincially and nationally, and his art is featured in corporate, private and public collections across Canada, the United States, and the United Kingdom including the Mosaic Corporation, the City of Regina, and the Dunlop Art Gallery. In 2014 he was commissioned by the Canadian Department of Foreign Affairs, Trade and Development to represent the Province of Saskatchewan for a project at Canada House in London, UK.

Public and Corporate Collections (selected) 

 Canada House, London, UK
 City of Regina, SK
 Dunlop Art Gallery, SK
 Saskatchewan Arts Board
 Timmins Family Health Network, ON
 The Mosaic Company, SK
 University of Regina, SK

Footnotes

References 
 
 
 
 Akimbo 
 Saskatchewan NAC 
  Galleries West. Fall/Winter 2012 Vol 11, No 3

External links 
 Canada House Collection
 Kyle Herranen
 Saskatchewan NAC Artists
 Slate Fine Art Gallery

1977 births
Artists from Ontario
Canadian conceptual artists
Interdisciplinary artists
Living people
University of Regina alumni
York University alumni
Artists from Regina, Saskatchewan